Codruț Ștefan Domșa (born 11 January 1974) is a Romanian former footballer who played as a defender.

Notes

References

1974 births
Living people
Romanian footballers
Association football defenders
Liga I players
Liga II players
CSM Ceahlăul Piatra Neamț players
Sportspeople from Suceava